Sir (Charles) Michael Walker  (22 November 1916 – 16 December 2001) was a British diplomat. He served as British High Commissioner to
Ceylon, later Sri Lanka (1962–66), to Malaysia (1966–1971), and to India (1974–76).

In January 1944, as a staff officer, he represented GHQ India at an Intelligence conference in Washington. He left the Army in the rank of lieutenant-colonel in 1946 and joined the Dominions Office. Seconded to the Foreign Office, Walker soon found himself back in Washington, this time for a term as First Secretary, from 1949 to 1951.

He went to Ceylon (later Sri Lanka) as High Commissioner in 1962. Three years later, he assumed the additional role of Britain's first ambassador to the Maldive Islands, after they had gained independence in July of that year.

Family
He married, in 1945, Enid McAdam, who survives him, together with their son and daughter.

References

1916 births
2001 deaths
Alumni of New College, Oxford
People educated at Charterhouse School
High Commissioners of the United Kingdom to the Maldives
High Commissioners of the United Kingdom to Malaysia
High Commissioners of the United Kingdom to Sri Lanka
High Commissioners of the United Kingdom to India
Knights Grand Cross of the Order of St Michael and St George